The 2006 South American Women's Football Championship (Campeonato Sudamericano de Fútbol Femenino 2006) was the fifth staging of the South American Women's Football Championship (now known as Copa América Femenina) and determined the CONMEBOL's qualifiers for the 2007 FIFA Women's World Cup and the 2008 Olympic Games football tournament. The tournament was held between November 10 and November 26 in the Argentine city of Mar del Plata.

The hosts Argentina won the tournament for the first time and qualified to their second FIFA Women's World Cup and their first Olympic tournament. Runners-up Brazil also qualified for the World Cup; but had to face Ghana in a play-off to qualify to the Olympics.

Venue 
Like in the 1998 edition, the only venue used for the tournament was the Estadio José María Minella, also known as Estadio Mundialista.

Officials
The following referees and assistant referees were named for the tournament:

Results
The tournament format is similar to the 1998 edition. It features a first round, where the ten teams are divided into two groups of five teams each. The top two teams in the groups advance to a final round, instead of a knockout stage.

The final round was set up in a round-robin format, where each team played one match against each of the other teams within the group. The top two teams in the group qualified for the 2007 FIFA Women's World Cup in the People's Republic of China, and the first-placed team won the tournament.

Three points were awarded for a win, one point for a draw, and zero points for a loss.

Tie-breaking criteria
Teams were ranked on the following criteria:
1. Greater number of points in all group matches
2. Goal difference in all group matches
3. Greater number of goals scored in all group matches
4. Head-to-head results
5. Drawing of lots by the CONMEBOL Organising Committee

Times listed were UTC–3.

First round

Group A

Group B

Final round
Argentina and Brazil qualified for the 2007 FIFA Women's World Cup and the 2008 Summer Olympics, although second-placed Brazil had to play an inter-continental play-off, which they won against Ghana eventually.

Awards

Statistics

Goalscorers
12 goals
 Cristiane
6 goals
 Daniela Alves
4 goals

 María Belén Potassa
 Irma Cuevas
 Angélica Souza

3 goals

 Rosana Gómez
 Elaine
 Nathalie Quezada
 Mabel Velarde
 Mónica Vega

2 goals

 Analía Almeida
 Clarisa Huber
 Andrea Ojeda
 Fabiana Vallejos
 Janeth Morón
 Renata Costa
 Grazielle
 Michele
 Mirta Alarcón
 Dulce Quintana
 Liria Ferrer

1 goal

 Mariela Coronel
 Marisa Gerez
 Eva Nadia González
 Analía Hirmbruchner
 Ludmila Manicler
 Florencia Quiñones
 Analisse Ríos
 Maitté Zamorano
 Aline
 Daniele
 Mônica
 Valeska Arias
 Karina Reyes
 Daniela Molina
 Luisa Moscoso
 Yulied Saavedra
 Marianela Vivas
 Lourdes Martínez
 Lourdes Ortiz
 Gladys Dorador
 Miryam Tristán
 Alejandra Laborda
 Carla Quinteros
 Haidlyn Espinosa
 Elvis Lovera

Own goals
 Guadalupe Chinchilla (playing against )
 María José Barrera (playing against )
 Belén Gaete (playing against )

Final ranking

References

External links
Tournament results at RSSSF
Official tournament page

2006 South American Women's Football Championship